The 1969–70 Coppa Italia, the 23rd Coppa Italia was an Italian Football Federation domestic cup competition won by Bologna.

Group stage

Group 1

Group 2

Group 3

Group 4

Group 5

Group 6

Group 7

Group 8

Group 9

Qualifying play-off 
The top seven groupwinners of the nine group qualifier in the quarter-finals. The other two teams played playoff. Foggia, Torino and Juventus won with the lowest points. Italian league decision: Foggia and Juventus plays the Play-off.

Quarter-finals 

Replay matches

Final group

Top goalscorers

References 

 rsssf.com

Coppa Italia seasons
Coppa Italia
Coppa Italia